Lady Margaret Seymour (1540 – ?) was an influential writer during the sixteenth century in England, along with her sisters, Anne Seymour, Countess of Warwick and Lady Jane Seymour, including of the Hecatodistichon. She was the daughter of Edward Seymour, 1st Duke of Somerset, who from 1547 was the Lord Protector of England after the death of Henry VIII and during the minority of Margaret's first cousin, Edward VI. She was thus the niece of Henry VIII's third wife, Queen Jane Seymour.

Ancestry

References

Daughters of English dukes
1540 births
16th-century English women writers
16th-century English writers
Year of death missing